Habenaria rumphii, commonly known as the stiff rein orchid, is a species of orchid that is widespread and common in Southeast Asia, New Guinea and northern Australia. It has six or seven leaves on the lower part of its stem and up to thirty white flowers with one long and two short lobes on the labellum.

Description 
Habenaria rumphii is a tuberous, perennial herb with six or seven leaves on the lower part of the stem. The dorsal sepal and petals overlap at their bases and form a hood over the column. The petals are a similar length to the sepals but narrower. Flowering occurs between February and March in Australia.

Taxonomy and naming
The stiff rein orchid was first formally described in 1834 by Adolphe-Théodore Brongniart who gave it the name Platanthera rumphii and published the description in Louis Isidore Duperrey's book Voyage Autour du Monde. In 1835, John Lindley changed the name to Habaneria rumphii. The specific epithet (rumphii) honours Georg Eberhard Rumphius who had given the orchid the name Orchis Amboinica minor.

Distribution and habitat
Habaneria rumphii grows with grasses in open forest and woodland in Australia. It also occurs in Thailand, Laos, Cambodia, Vietnam, Malaysia, Indonesia, the Philippines and New Guinea. In Australia it is found on the Cape York Peninsula and south to Ingham as well as on some Torres Strait Islands. There is a single record from the Northern Territory, where the species is listed as "endangered".

References

Orchids of Cambodia
Orchids of Indonesia
Orchids of Laos
Orchids of Malaysia
Orchids of New Guinea
Orchids of the Philippines
Orchids of Queensland
Orchids of Thailand
Orchids of Vietnam
Plants described in 1834
rumphii
Taxa named by Adolphe-Théodore Brongniart